Srednje Laknice is a settlement east of Mokronog in the Municipality of Mokronog-Trebelno in the historical region of Lower Carniola in southeastern Slovenia. The municipality is now included in the Southeast Slovenia Statistical Region.

References

External links
Srednje Laknice on Geopedia

Populated places in the Municipality of Mokronog-Trebelno